Shan United Football Club is a Burmese football club, based in Taunggyi, Myanmar. Their home stadium name is Taunggyi Stadium in Shan State. Former name is Kanbawza FC and name changed in 2015.

Sponsorship

Club

Coaching staff
{|class="wikitable"
|-
!Position
!Staff
|-
|Manager|| Soe Myat Min
|-
|rowspan="3"|Assistant Manager|| U Thein Tun Thein
|-
| U Min Zaw Oo
|-
| U Han Win Aung
|-
|Technical coach ||
|-
|Goalkeeper Coach|| U Aung Thet
|-
|Fitness Coach|| Mr Poket
|-

Other information

|-

First team squad

Transfers

In:

Out:

Half-season transfer
Aly Camara = Cancel contract
Behshad Yavarzadeh = Cancel contract

References

External links
 Kanbawza FC in Burmese
 First Eleven Journal in Burmese
 Soccer Myanmar in Burmese

Shan United